Josateki Basalusalu (born 19 February 1955) is a Fijian judoka. He competed in the men's middleweight event at the 1988 Summer Olympics.

References

External links

1955 births
Living people
Fijian male judoka
Olympic judoka of Fiji
Judoka at the 1988 Summer Olympics
Place of birth missing (living people)